Matthew "Scott" Biason is a retired American soccer player who played professionally in the Major Indoor Soccer League and National Professional Soccer League.

Biason graduated from Granite City High School.  He attended Western Illinois University, playing on the men's soccer team from 1986 to 1990.  In the fall of 1991, he turned professional with the St. Louis Storm of the Major Indoor Soccer League.  In 1992, he moved to the St. Louis Ambush of the National Professional Soccer League.  Biason played two games before moving to the Denver Thunder for the remainder of the season.

External links
 Career stats

References

Living people
American soccer players
Denver Thunder players
Major Indoor Soccer League (1978–1992) players
National Professional Soccer League (1984–2001) players
Soccer players from Illinois
St. Louis Ambush (1992–2000) players
St. Louis Storm players
Western Illinois Leathernecks men's soccer players
Association football defenders
Year of birth missing (living people)